Lomaita is a monotypic genus of Caribbean dwarf spiders containing the single species, Lomaita darlingtoni. It was first described by E. B. Bryant in 1948, and has only been found in Dominican Republic.

See also
 List of Linyphiidae species (I–P)

References

Linyphiidae
Monotypic Araneomorphae genera
Spiders of the Caribbean